Aries: Journal for the Study of Western Esotericism is a peer-reviewed academic journal covering the academic and historical study of Western esotericism. It is published by Brill Academic Publishers on behalf of the European Society for the Study of Western Esotericism. From 2001-2010, the editor-in-chief was Wouter Hanegraaff. Since 2010, the editor-in-chief is Peter J. Forshaw. Two issues are published annually; in recent years the first one is a special issue, devoted to a specific theme proposed by a guest editor.

See also
Magic, Ritual, and Witchcraft
The Pomegranate: The International Journal of Pagan Studies

External links 
 
 Aries Old Series (1985-1999) - Contents & downloadable articles
 Aries New Series (2001-present) - Contents

History journals
Biannual journals
Western esotericism studies journals
Brill Publishers academic journals
Publications established in 2001
English-language journals